The Tattnall County School District is a public school district in Tattnall County, Georgia, United States, based in Reidsville. It serves the communities of Cobbtown, Collins, Glennville, Manassas, and Reidsville.

It serves as the designated K-12 school district for the county, except parts in Fort Stewart. Fort Stewart has the Department of Defense Education Activity (DoDEA) as its local school district, for the elementary level. Students at the secondary level on Fort Stewart attend public schools operated by county school districts.

Schools
The Tattnall County School District has three elementary schools, two middle schools, and one high school.

Elementary schools
Collins Elementary School
Glennville Elementary School
Reidsville Elementary School

Middle school
South Tattnall Middle School
North Tattnall Middle School

High school
Tattnall County High School

Gallery

References

External links

Tattnall County School District

School districts in Georgia (U.S. state)
Education in Tattnall County, Georgia